Rhinochimaera is a genus of cartilaginous fish in the family Rhinochimaeridae, with these species:
 Rhinochimaera africana Compagno, Stehmann & Ebert, 1990 (paddlenose chimaera)
 Rhinochimaera atlantica Holt & Byrne, 1909  (broadnose chimaera)
 Rhinochimaera pacifica Mitsukuri, 1895 (Pacific spookfish)

References

 
Articles containing video clips
Cartilaginous fish genera
Taxa named by Samuel Garman
Taxonomy articles created by Polbot